Stern (German for "Star") is an illustrated, broadly left-liberal, weekly current affairs magazine published in Hamburg, Germany, by Gruner + Jahr, a subsidiary of Bertelsmann. Under the editorship (1948–1980) of its founder Henri Nannen, it attained a circulation of between 1.5 and 1.8 million, the largest in Europe's for a magazine of its kind.

Unusually for a popular magazine in post-war West Germany, and most notably in the contributions to 1975 of Sebastian Haffner, Stern investigated the origin and nature of the preceding tragedies of German history. In 1983, however, its credibility was seriously damaged by its purchase and syndication of the forged Hitler Diaries. A sharp drop in sales anticipated the general fall in newsprint readership in the new century.  By 2019, circulation had fallen under half a million.

History and profile

Journalistic style
Henri Nannen produced the first 16-page issue (with the actress Hildegard Knef on the cover) on 1 August 1948. He moved the magazine to Hamburg where, in 1965, he founded , now one of the largest publishing houses in Europe.

Under Nannen's direction,  sought to present itself as an exemplar of what in Germany is called  ('useful journalism'). The emphasis is on providing sufficient background on topic to allow readers opportunity to arrive at their own judgements rather than have these decided for them editorially or (as was commonly the case in the tabloid output of rival publisher ) in the headlines. As a result articles tended to be longer and more investigative, while distinguished from those of the similarly directed  by the wider range of social and life-style issues covered, and by a greater reliance of illustration and graphic design.

Breaks with the Adenauer consensus
Stern was open to the questioning, from a liberal and left perspective, of the post-war political and social order in West Germany identified with the long Chancellorship (1949–1963) of Konrad Adenauer.

In the 1962  affair, Stern denounced as violations of constitutional norms and press freedom, the effective closure by the government of the magazine's publishing rival. In a contest seen a key turning point in the culture of the Federal Republic away from the deference demanded by the old  ('authoritarian state'), Stern (together with Springer Press and ) offered  presses, teletypes and office space so it could continue publishing while being investigated for national security disclosures.

 found nothing to extenuate in the later violence of the Red Army Faction (the " Gang"), but in the 1960s it had not been completely hostile to the student protest movement from which the "urban guerillas" first emerged. In June 1967, it permitted Sebastian Haffner to denounce the police response to a demonstration in West Berlin in which student protester Benno Ohnesorg was killed, as "a systematic, cold-blooded, planned pogrom". In contrast the Springer's  responded: “Students threaten: We shoot back”.

Like the student left,  was willing to break the relative post-war silence on the recent National-Socialist past. In serialisations Haffner developed his thesis that Hitler's war was a tragedy foretold in the circumstances of German unification in the nineteenth century. As interpreted by many conservatives this amounted to an acceptance of Germany's postwar division, and territorial losses in the east, as permanent.

 (No. 50, 1970) published Sven Simon's (Axel Springer Jr.) iconic picture of Brandt kneeling before the memorial to the Warsaw Ghetto Uprising on 20 Dezember 1970 on a double spread. It was accompanied by an interview with Brandt's Polish host, premier Józef Cyrankiewicz, with whom he had that day signed the Treaty of Warsaw. At the same time,  sought to discredit the rival conservative weekly Quick, which in opposition to the Treaty had published material from its secret protocols. It accused the magazine's editor Hans van Nouhuys of having been a double agent, at one time in the employ of the East German .  successfully withstood the charge of defamation.

Encounters with second-wave feminism
In a further challenge to settled post-war conventions, on June 6, 1971  appeared with the headline "We've had abortions!" (Issue 24/1971). In an action initiated by Alice Schwarzer, 374 women confessed to having had pregnancies terminated. They were protesting Paragraph 218 of West Germany's penal code, the  under which abortion was illegal. The taboo-breaking publicity was viewed by many as a milestone in the feminist revival of the 1970s.
   
However, itself became the target of the new feminism when, in 1978, Schwarzer and nine other women sued , and Nannen, on the grounds that the magazine's frequent "cover girls" denied the human dignity of women by presenting them "as a mere sexual object". The immediate occasion was a picture of the model Grace Jones, described by Schwarzer in her monthly Emma (7/1978) as “a black woman, naked, in her hand a phallic microphone and around the shackles – heavy chains”. (It later occurred to Schwarzer that they might also have complained of the image's racism).

Nannen protested that the magazine's nudes should be seen in the same light as Francisco Goya's "The Unclothed Maja" (1797) and that the freedom of the press was at issue. The complainants proved unable in law to indict soft-pornographic practices that were rife in the popular press, but Nannen allowed that the case had "made us think".

There was no obvious shift in the editorial culture of the magazine. The uncovered "cover-girl" tradition, sometimes in the form of celebrity shoots ("With Madonna alone at home", 10 January 1992), continued. Feminists also had occasion to object to article content. In 1990,  published the title story "I am a masochist" in which author Sina-Aline Geißler discussed her literary coming-out as a member of the BDSM scene. This caused an intense public debate, and women later occupied the magazine's editorial offices alarmed at what they believed was a glamorisation of misogynist abuse.

Scandal of the Hitler Diaries

For  very much more damaging publicity followed its serialisation, beginning in April 1983, of the so-called Hitler Diaries. Scientific examination soon proved that the "diaries", for which the magazine had paid 9.3 million , were forgeries.  The resulting fiasco led to the resignation of the magazine's editors, a sit-in by staff to protest the "management's bypassing traditional editorial channels and safeguards", and a major press scandal that is still regarded as a low point in German journalism.

A publication "once known for its investigative reporting" became a byword for the folly and hazards of "sensation-seeking check book journalism". 's credibility was severely damaged and it took the magazine many years to regain its pre-scandal status and reputation.

Trump: 

In its 24 August 2017 edition  demonstrated its continued ability and willingness to generate cover-page controversy (and, for the purpose, to discard the restraints of ). A photo-shopped image depicted then United States President, Donald Trump, draped in the American flag while giving a stiff-armed Nazi salute. “”, read the headline, or “his struggle” – a reference to Adolf Hitler’s autobiographical manifesto, . The sub-headline reads: “Neo Nazis, Ku Klux Klan, racism: How Donald Trump fuelled hatred in America”.

The Los Angeles-based Simon Wiesenthal Center, while critical of President Trump's failure, in his remarks following the 13 May "Unite the Right" rally in Charlottesville, Virginia, to "make a distinction between Nazis and KKK protesters and those who opposed them”, described “the depiction of the president as a latter-day Hitler by a major German publication" as "untrue and beyond the pale". "Germans", they suggest, "must surely know that by misappropriating [...] Nazi symbols and terms associated with Adolf Hitler, they belittle and becloud the crimes of the past.” Jewish leaders in Germany similarly argued that the depiction of Trump as the new Hitler diminished Nazi genocide.

Stern responded: "The right-wing protesters in Charlottesville raised their arms in the Nazi salute and the American president has not distanced himself from this gesture or from the mindset of the people. On the contrary, Donald Trump had seen in some of them 'fine people.' With this attitude, he identifies with the protesters and greets them in a transcendent sense – that is exactly what the  cover visualises. It is, of course, far from us to want to minimise the atrocities of the National Socialists".

Trump made several other  covers. For the 19 January 2017 edition he was seated on the Lincoln Memorial throne: "The Emperor, how Donald Trump is changing the world and why he is so dangerous for us". For the 10 September 2020 edition he was in close up: "American Psycho, how Donald Trump is systematically destroying democracy".

Diminishing sales and circulation
Thanks in part, perhaps, to the 1992 closure of Quick, at the turn of the century  was still selling well over one million copies. The magazine has had an on-line presence since 1995. The e-paper circulation of has almost tripled since 2015: from almost 8,500 copies in the second quarter of 2015 to around 26,800 in the fourth quarter of 2020. The significant decrease in the total circulation remains. Actual readership, however, is several times higher than copies sold or subscribed to online.

The fall in advertising sales has been commensurate with the fall in circulation: an advertising revenue of 218 million euros in 2003 had fallen to 107.3 million euros by 2020. It is a measure of the general decline of newsprint that in 2020  still took first place in the ranking of the popular magazines with the highest advertising sales.

It is notable that a 2013 reformatting of the printed edition mimics on-line features and conventions. There is a greater use of sidebars and infographics. The language is less formal, and there is even greater emphasis on arresting large-print photography.

Editors-in-chief
1948–1980: Henri Nannen
1980–1983: Rolf Gillhausen, Peter Koch and Felix Schmidt
1983–1984: Rolf Gillhausen with Peter Scholl-Latour
1984–1986: Rolf Winter
1986–1989: Heiner Bremer, Michael Jürgs and Klaus Liedtke
1989–1990: Michael Jürgs with Herbert Riehl-Heyse
1990–1994: Rolf Schmidt-Holtz
1994–1998: Werner Funk
1999–1999: Michael Maier
1999–2013: Thomas Osterkorn and Andreas Petzold
2013–2014: Dominik Wichmann
2014–2018: Christian Krug
2019–2022: Florian Gless and Anna-Beeke Gretemeier
since 2022: Gregor Peter Schmitz and Anna-Beeke Gretemeier

Well-known contributors 

 Niklas Frank, culture editor, son of the National Socialist war criminal Hans Frank
 Sebastian Haffner, anti-Nazi exile, historian, columnist
 Gerd Heidemann, reporter who in 1983 acquired the forged Hitler diaries for the magazine.
 Volker Hinz, photojournalist.
 Erich Kuby, publicist and journalist.
 Robert Lebeck, photojournalist
 Niklaus Meienberg, Swiss writer and journalist.
 Reimar Oltmanns, author and journalist. 
 Michael Ruetz, photojournalist.
 Günther Schwarberg, writer, journalist, long-serving editor.

See also
 List of magazines in Germany

References

External links
  
 
 

 
1948 establishments in Germany
Centrist newspapers
German-language magazines
News magazines published in Germany
German news websites
Liberal media in Germany
Weekly magazines published in Germany
Magazines established in 1948
Magazines published in Hamburg
Weekly news magazines